Line Bazar is an important location in the city of Purnia, Bihar(Others being Bus stand, Bhatta Bazar, Khuskibagh(largest retail groceries market in northeast Bihar), and gulabbagh(Largest Wholesale market in northeast Bihar)). It is an important medical hub serving a large population of patients from North-East Bihar as well as neighboring Nepal and West Bengal. Line Bazar is a key place in Purnia Division and Kosi Division and is well known for the quality of medical facilities available. Sadar Hospital and Purnia Government Medical College are located here. Line Bazar is located on NH 231.

Line Bazar is fully facilitated with good doctors, private and government medical colleges and hospitals, blood banks, and chemists, and also has a good transportation facility to travel to all the important destinations within the city.

Prominent Hospitals

 Sadar Hospital
 Max 7 Hospital
 Sanjeeveni Hospital
 Maa Pancha Devi Stone Hospital
 Fatma Hospital
 Harsh Hospital
 Sadbhavna General Hospital

Purnia
 Buildings and structures in Bihar